David Lambie (13 July 1925 – 15 December 2019) was a Scottish Labour Party politician.

Lambie was educated at Ardrossan Academy and at the University of Glasgow and Geneva University. He became a teacher and was chairman of the Scottish Labour Party from 1965 to 1966.

Lambie contested North Ayrshire and Bute in 1955, 1959, 1964 and 1966. He was Member of Parliament for Central Ayrshire from 1970 until 1983, and after the boundary changes of that year, for Cunninghame South from 1983 until his retirement in 1992.

On 13 July 2015 Lambie celebrated his 90th birthday.

In popular culture
Lambie was portrayed by Renny Krupinski in the 2002 BBC production of Ian Curteis's controversial The Falklands Play.

References

The Times Guide to the House of Commons, Times Newspapers Ltd, 1966 & 1987

1925 births
2019 deaths
Scottish Labour MPs
UK MPs 1970–1974
UK MPs 1974
UK MPs 1974–1979
UK MPs 1979–1983
UK MPs 1983–1987
UK MPs 1987–1992
People from Saltcoats
Alumni of the University of Glasgow
Scottish expatriates in Switzerland
University of Geneva alumni
Members of the Parliament of the United Kingdom for Scottish constituencies